"I Wanna Be Down" is the debut single of American recording artist Brandy from her self-titled debut album (1994). It was written by musicians Keith Crouch and Kipper Jones, with production helmed by the former, it was released on September 5, 1994, by the Atlantic Recording Corporation. The song is a mid-tempo track that features a thunderous beat and light synth riffs. Lyrically, "I Wanna Be Down" describes a flirt with a boy, who Norwood tries to convince of her loveliness.

The song's music video was filmed by Keith Ward and released in October 1994. It features Norwood in her tomboyish image, dancing in front of a jeep near a forest, surrounded  by backup dancers. "I Wanna Be Down" was performed on several television and award show ceremonies, such as The Tonight Show with Jay Leno, the 1996 Soul Train Music Awards, and the 2014 BET Hip Hop Awards. It has been performed on almost every one of Norwood's concerts and tours, and is featured on the compilation album The Best of Brandy (2005).

"I Wanna Be Down" was released to positive reaction by contemporary music critics. Its impact on the charts was comparatively large for a debut single: While it spent four weeks on top of the US Billboard Hot R&B Singles chart, it reached number six on the Billboard Hot 100, and the top 20 in Australia and New Zealand. In 1995, a hip hop remix with new lyrics from female rappers MC Lyte, Queen Latifah, and Yo-Yo was released.

Background
"I Wanna Be Down" was written by Keith Crouch and Kipper Jones, while production and arrangement was also handled by the former for Human Rhythm Productions during 1993. Darryl Simmons served as executive producer, while mastering was overseen by Brian Gardner. Chosen by Norwood's record company, Atlantic Records, as the leading single from her debut album, Norwood initially did not like the idea of releasing it as her first offering. "I Wanna Be Down' was interesting," she said in a retrospective interview with Complex magazine in 2012. "I didn't really get it at first, but I was young and I didn't really know what worked at radio or what it was. I liked the song, but I just didn't get it being the first thing that people heard from me." Upon its chart success, she changed her mind on their decision however: "[...] Once it was released and I saw why everyone responded to the title phrase, I understood why!"
Norwood signed with Teaspoon Productions, directed by Chris Stokes and Earl Harris, in 1990, which led to a role as a backing singer for the boy band, Immature. She met Darryl Williams , who at the time was the record company manager for Capitol Records.

Composition and lyrics

"I Wanna Be Down" is a contemporary R&B production that lasts for four minutes and fifty-one seconds (4:51). The mid-tempo song contains keyboards and drums and is influenced by the music genre hip hop soul. It was written, produced and arranged by Keith Crouch and Kipper Jones at Human Rhythm Studios. The background song was performed by Norwood and Tiara Le Macks. Booker T. Jones was responsible for the sound mix. The lyrics are about a young woman's love for a man. In the chorus, Brandy sings: "I wanna be down with what you're going through / I wanna be down / I wanna be down with you". Atlantic decided to release the song as Brandy's debut single, something she, at first, did not like. In an interview with Complex Magazine several years later, she stated: "'I Wanna Be Down' was interesting" and continued: "I did not understand the thing first. I was young and did not understand what would and what would not go home at radio stations "I liked the song but did not like the idea that it was the first single that people would hear from me."  After the single became a hit, Brandy changed his mind about Atlantic's choice: later understood why they wanted to publish it. Everyone started using the phrase 'I wanna be down ..' and I had an 'aha' experience! "

Release
Atlantic printed thirteen different single versions of "I Wanna Be Down". The most common CD / Maxi release included the album version, an extended mix called "Cool Out" and an a cappella version.  On the cover, Brandy is seen sitting in an overall in front of a blue gate. The photo was taken by photographer Michael Miller who has previously worked with artists such as Cypress Hill and Daddy Freddy. In Europe, the song was released via East West Records and had the same table of contents as on the CD / Maxi single in the USA. In the UK, the song was printed on "12 vinyl records that were identical to the North American vinyl records. These editions included remix versions of the song such as" Carson CA Edit "and" 3 Boyz Dub ".

Human Rhythm Hip Hop Remix
At the release of "I Wanna Be Down", Sylvia Rhone , Atlantic Records' record label manager, came up with the idea of re-recording the song with a group of female rappers. A new, more hip-hop-influenced instrumentation was created as well as new verses performed by the female rappers MC Lyte , Queen Latifah and Yo-Yo. In an interview in 2012, Brandy said; "The hip-hop remix meant everything to me. I'm a newcomer and all these superstars are on my song! I was a big Queen Latifah fan and thought, 'Oh my God ... I can not believe this is really happening to me.' I had the opportunity to hang out with all three. They took care of me like I was their little sister. I became one of the first artists to introduce hip hop on R&B beats . It had never been done the same way. I knew it was a especially song. "  "Human Rhythm Hip Hop Remix" was released as a b-side to "Baby", Brandy's second single released on December 24, 1994.

Critical reception
Steve Baltin from Cash Box concluded that "I Wanna Be Down" "has the teen-aged Brandy poised to be the next big thing in the R&B market." He explained further, "By mixing a traditional r&b style with a hip-hop groove. Brandy has created a song with across-the-board appeal that will continue to rise on the pop charts." Pan-European magazine Music & Media wrote, "One Bourbon, one Scotch, one beer; in the world of music, that used to be the order booze poured in, until this teenage girl entered the swingbeat ring. Slowly you'll be punch drunk." Alan Jones from Music Week deemed the song as "a slow, sinewy number in the TLC mould". Ralp Tee from the magazine's RM Dance Update wrote, "Just 16 years old, Brandy ventures into the same musical territory as fellow teenager Aaliyah. Simply exploding on import over last weekend, the track is essentially a catchy two-stepper with the arrangement kept to a basic drum and bass pattern, interspersed with subtle keyboard and synth guitar. An impressive debut." Another editor, James Hamilton described it as a "slinky girls' superb smoochy Isleys-ish guitar backed 86bpm US smash".

Music video
The original music video for "I Wanna Be Down" was directed by Keith Ward and premiered prior to the single's official release in September 1994. The video portrays Norwood in her tomboyish image, dancing in front of a Hummer near a forest, surrounded by backup dancers. Her first video shooting, Norwood explained the filming a great experience: "I was so excited about the video. I got a chance to work with some great people like Frank Gatson. All my friends were in the video. My brother was in the video [...] He was there and we had this little dance, and that became really popular. That was a fun time. I was so excited because my dream was coming through right before my eyes... at the age of 15".

Hip hop remix

Upon its release, Atlantic Records head Sylvia Rhone came up with the idea of re-recording the track with a group of rappers. "I Wanna Be Down" was eventually remixed with new lyrics from female rappers MC Lyte, Queen Latifah, and Yo-Yo. "The hip-hop remix meant the world to me," Norwood stated in 2012. "I'm fresh out of the box and these superstars are a part of my first single! They are my mentors and I looked up to them. I was a huge Queen Latifah fan. I'm thinking, 'Oh my God...I can't believe this is happening to me.' I got the chance to vibe with all three of them. They embraced me as a little sister. I was one of the first R&B artists to welcome hip-hop onto an R&B beat. It had never been done before quite like that[...] I knew it was a special record."

Music video
A music video for the Human Rhythm Hip Hop Remix premiered in February 1995. It was filmed by director Hype Williams whose remix video for Craig Mack's 1994 song "Flava in Ya Ear" served as inspiration for the video. A simple performance video, it features appearances by Lyte, Latifah, and Yo-Yo and was photographed "in glamorous black and white and vivacious color, complete with flashbulbs popping to the beat." Norwood's younger brother Ray J made a cameo appearance in the video. This version eventually earned Norwood her first nomination for a MTV Video Music Award for Best Rap Video at the 1995 ceremony.

Track listings
All tracks written by Keith Crouch and Kipper Jones, and produced by the former.

Credits and personnel
Credits adapted from the liner notes of Brandy.

Keith Crouch – producer, recording, writer
Brian Gardner – mastering
Booker T. Jones – mixing

Kipper Jones – writer
Tiara LeMack – backing vocals
Brandy Norwood – backing vocals, lead vocals

Charts

Weekly charts

Year-end charts

All-time charts

Certifications

See also
R&B number-one hits of 1994 (USA)

References

External links
 ForeverBrandy.com — official site

1994 debut singles
Brandy Norwood songs
Music videos directed by Hype Williams
Songs written by Keith Crouch
Songs written by Kipper Jones
1994 songs
Atlantic Records singles